Susan Schulten is an American historian, and professor at the University of Denver.

She graduated from the University of California, Berkeley with a B.A., and from the University of Pennsylvania, with a PhD.

She is a current member of the Colorado State Historian's Council.

Awards
 2010 Guggenheim Fellowship

Works
The geographical imagination in America, 1880-1950, University of Chicago Press, 2001, 
Mapping the Nation: History and Cartography in Nineteenth-Century America, University of Chicago Press, 2012, 
A History of America in 100 Maps, University of Chicago Press, 2012,

References

External links

University of California, Berkeley alumni
University of Pennsylvania alumni
University of Denver faculty
Living people
Year of birth missing (living people)
21st-century American historians
American women historians
21st-century American women writers